Anne Heurgon-Desjardins (born 1899 – 1977, Manche) was a French philanthropist, the founder of the Centre culturel international de Cerisy-la-Salle.

Biography 

After the death of her father in 1940, she decided with her mother to sell the abbaye de Pontigny in order to renovate the château of Cerisy-la-Salle, a maternal property. In this place, she welcomed writers such as Raymond Aron, Martin Heidegger, Francis Ponge, Raymond Queneau, Eugène Ionesco and Alain Robbe-Grillet.

Upon her death, her daughters Catherine and Edith Heurgon Peyrou in turn kept on perpetuating these meetings.

External links 
 Une bibliothèque dans un jardin, Bibliothèque Henry et Isabel Goüin
 Site des colloques de Cerisy
 Correspondance avec Paul Desjardins, Jacques Heurgon et Anne Heurgon-Desjardins
 College Anne Heurgon-Desjardins Cerisy la salle

French patrons of the arts
1899 births
1977 deaths
20th-century philanthropists